Vallonia pulchella, common name the lovely vallonia, is a species of very small air-breathing land snail, a terrestrial pulmonate gastropod mollusk in the family Valloniidae.

Description
For terms see gastropod shell

The shell is circular in outline, with 3.2 - 3.3 whorls. The last whorl is wider immediately before the aperture, and is not much descending. Compared to Vallonia costata, the aperture is not very oblique, and the lip is weaker than in that species. Vallonia pulchella also has slightly more elevated whorls than Vallonia costata. Like other Vallonia species, the umbilicus is very wide.

The shell is ivory-white with very fine and irregular streaks. The soft parts are milky white. The tentacles are short, and the posterior end of the foot is round.

Distribution
This species occurs in several countries and islands, including:

Europe:
 Great Britain
 Ireland
 Czech Republic
 Slovakia
 Poland
 Ukraine
 Germany
 Netherlands
 Latvia
 and other areas

America:
 British Columbia,<ref>Robert G. Forsyth. Terrestrial Gastropods of the Columbia Basin, British Columbia Family Valloniidae. Accessed 25 April 2009.</ref> Canada
 Illinois, United States of America
 Brazil

 Life habits 
The size of the egg is 0.5 mm.

In this species some parental care was observed: apparently the eggs were cleaned of fungi. Parental care is very rare in gastropods in general and has otherwise been observed only in the genus Libera''.

In North America it is commonly found in woodlands and suburban gardens. It lives in moist soil and may be attracted to decaying material.

References

 Herbert, D. & Kilburn, D. (2004). Field guide to the land snails and slugs of eastern South Africa. Pietermaritzburg: Natal Museum. [v] + 336 pp.
 Connolly, M. (1939). A monographic survey of South African non-marine Mollusca. Annals of the South African Museum. 33: 1-660.
 Herbert, D.G. (2010). The introduced terrestrial Mollusca of South Africa. SANBI Biodiversity Series, 15: vi + 108 pp. Pretoria.
 Kerney, M.P., Cameron, R.A.D. & Jungbluth, J-H. (1983). Die Landschnecken Nord- und Mitteleuropas. Ein Bestimmungsbuch für Biologen und Naturfreunde, 384 pp., 24 plates.
 Sysoev, A. V. & Schileyko, A. A. (2009). Land snails and slugs of Russia and adjacent countries. Sofia/Moskva (Pensoft). 312 pp., 142 plates.
 Griffiths, O.L. & Florens, V.F.B. (2006). A field guide to the non-marine molluscs of the Mascarene Islands (Mauritius, Rodrigues and Réunion) and the northern dependencies of Mauritius. Bioculture Press: Mauritius. Pp. i–xv, 1–185, pls 1-32.
 Ramakrishna, Mitra, S, C. & Dey, A. (2010). Annotated checklist of Indian land molluscs. Zoological Survey of India, Kolkata, 359 pp.
 Cameron, R. A. D., Teixeira, D., Pokryszko, B., Silva, I. & Groh, K. (2021). An annotated checklist of the extant and Quaternary land molluscs of the Desertas Islands, Madeiran Archipelago. Journal of Conchology. 44(1): 53-70.
 Jaeckel, S. (1956). Die Weichtiere (Mollusca) der Afghanistan-Expedition (1952-1953). Mitteilungen aus dem Zoologischen Museum in Berlin. 32(2): 337-353.

External links 

 Vallonia pulchella at Animalbase taxonomy,short description, distribution, biology,status (threats), images 
Vallonia pulchella The Evergreen State College
 Müller, O. F. (1774). Vermium terrestrium et fluviatilium, seu animalium infusorium, Helminthicorum, et testaceorum, non marinorum, succincta historia. vol 2: I-XXXVI, 1-214, 10 unnumbered pages. Havniae et Lipsiae, apud Heineck et Faber, ex officina Molleriana
 De Stefani, C. (1880). Molluschi continentali fino ad ora notati in ltalia nei terreni pliocenici, ed ordinamento di questi ultimi (continuazione). Atti della Societa Toscana di Scienze Naturali Residente in Pisa. 5, 9-108
 Say T. (1817). Descriptions of new species of land and fresh water shells of the United States. Journal of the Academy of Natural Sciences of Philadelphia. 1 (6): 123-126
 Westerlund, C. A. (1898). Novum specilegium malacologicum. Neue Binnenconchylien aus der paläarktischen Region. Annuaire du Musée Zoologique de l'Académie Impériale des Sciences de St.-Pétersbourg. 3 (2): 155-183. St.-Petersburg
 Mendes da Costa, E. (1778). Historia naturalis testaceorum Britanniæ, or, the British conchology; containing the descriptions and other particulars of natural history of the shells of Great Britain and Ireland: illustrated with figures. In English and French. - Historia naturalis testaceorum Britanniæ, ou, la conchologie Britannique; contenant les descriptions & autres particularités d'histoire naturelle des coquilles de la Grande Bretagne & de l'Irlande: avec figures en taille douce. En anglois & françois. i-xii, 1-254
 Bieler, R. & Slapcinsky, J. (2000). A case study for the development of an island fauna: Recent terrestrial mollusks of Bermuda. Nemouria. 44: 1-99
 Germain, L. (1921). Mission zoologique de M. Paul Carié aux îles Mascareignes. Faune malacologique terrestre et fluviatile des îles Mascareignes. Mémoires de la Société Zoologique de France, Volume supplémentaire: iv + 495 pp., pl. 1-13. Paris
 Rosen, O. W. von. (1892). Beitrag zur Kenntnis der Molluskenfauna Transkaspiens und Chorassans. Nachrichtsblatt der Deutschen Malakozoologischen Gesellschaft. 24(7/8): 121-126. Frankfurt am Main
 Pilsbry, H. A. (1900). Land snails of Cape May, New Jersey. The Nautilus. 14(7): 73-75
 Williamson, M. B. (1898). Vallonia on the Pacific Slope. The Nautilus. 12(6): 71-72
 Stearns, R. E. C. (1900). Vallonia pulchella Müll., in Los Angeles and elsewhere in California, etc. The Nautilus. 14(6): 65-67
 Clapp, G. H. (1901). Vallonia pulchella. The Nautilus. 14(11): 130
 Stearns, R. E. C. (1903). Mollusks ocurring in southern California. The Nautilus. 16(12): 133-134
 Bryant, O. (1905). Some notes on Bermudian mollusks. The Nautilus. 18(11): 129-131
 Sterki, V. (1905). November snails. The Nautilus. 19(8): 96.
 Clapp, G. H. (1897). Vallonia pulchella in Pittsburgh. The Nautilus. 10(12): 143

Valloniidae
Gastropods described in 1774
Taxa named by Otto Friedrich Müller